Augustus Montague Summers (10 April 1880 – 10 August 1948) was an English author, clergyman, and teacher. He initially prepared for a career in the Church of England at Oxford and Lichfield, and was ordained as an Anglican deacon in 1908. He then converted to Roman Catholicism and began styling himself as a Catholic priest. He was, however, never affiliated with any Catholic diocese or religious order, and it is doubtful that he was ever actually ordained to the priesthood. He was employed as a teacher of English and Latin while independently pursuing scholarly work on the English drama of the 17th century. The latter earned him election to the Royal Society of Literature in 1916.

Noted for his eccentric personality and interests, Summers became a well known figure in London society as a result of the publication of his History of Witchcraft and Demonology in 1926. That work was followed by other studies on witchcraft, vampires, and werewolves, in all of which he professed to believe. Summers also produced a modern English translation, published in 1929, of the 15th-century witch hunter's manual, the Malleus Maleficarum. He has been characterized as "arguably the most seminal twentieth century purveyor of pop culture occultism."

Early life

Montague Summers was the youngest of the seven children of Augustus William Summers, a rich banker and justice of the peace in Clifton, Bristol. Summers was educated at Clifton College before studying theology at Trinity College, Oxford, with the intention of becoming a priest in the Church of England. In 1905, he received a fourth-class Bachelor of Arts degree. He then continued his religious training at Lichfield Theological College.

Summers self-published his first book, Antinous and Other Poems, in 1907. Its contents reflected the influence of the literary Decadent movement while showcasing Summers' own preoccupations with pederasty, medievalism, Catholicism, and the occult. Summers was ordained as deacon in 1908 and worked as a curate in Bath and Bitton, near Bristol. He never proceeded to higher orders, however, probably because of rumours of his interest in Satanism and accusations of sexual impropriety with young boys, for which he was tried and acquitted.

In 1909, Summers converted to Catholicism and began studying for the Catholic priesthood at St John's Seminary, Wonersh, receiving the clerical tonsure on 28 December 1910. After 1913 he styled himself as the "Reverend Alphonsus Joseph-Mary Augustus Montague Summers" and acted as a Catholic priest, even though he was never a member of any Catholic order or diocese. Whether he was actually ordained as a priest is disputed.

According to some sources, Summers had transferred from the seminary in Wornesh to the Diocese of Nottingham, but the local bishop refused to ordain him after receiving incriminating reports of Summers' prior conduct. Other sources claim that Summers travelled to Continental Europe and was ordained there by Cardinal Mercier in Belgium or by Archbishop Guido Maria Conforti in Italy. According to yet another version of events, Summers was ordained as a priest by Ulric Vernon Herford, the self-styled "Bishop of Mercia" and one of several episcopi vagantes ("wandering bishops") operating in Britain at the time.

Summers' interest in Satanism appears to have derived in part from his reading of the works of the French writer Joris-Karl Huysmans, particularly the novel Là-bas (1891), which includes an account of a Black Mass. Summers himself later claimed in private conversation to have attended Black Masses in Bruges, Brighton, and London. There are also testimonies from former associates, including the poet J. Redwood Anderson, suggesting that Summers may even have conducted such ceremonies himself.

Literary scholarship

From 1911 to 1926 Summers found employment as an English and Latin teacher at several schools, including Brockley County School in south-east London. With the encouragement of Arthur Henry Bullen of the Shakespeare Head Press, Summers successfully established himself as a scholarly authority on the theatre of the Stuart Restoration. Summers successively edited the plays of Aphra Behn, William Congreve, William Wycherley, Thomas Otway, Thomas Shadwell, and John Dryden. He also helped to create a new society called "The Phoenix" that performed those neglected works. Summers' work on Restoration drama earned him election as fellow of the Royal Society of Literature in 1916.

Several decades after his death, Robert D. Hume characterized Montague Summers' scholarship on Restoration drama as pioneering and useful, but also marred by sloppiness, eccentricity, uncritical deference to Sir Edmund Gosse and other similar gentlemen-amateurs, and even occasional dishonesty. Hume judged Summers' studies on The Restoration Theatre (1934) and The Playhouse of Pepys (1935) to be particularly fruitful sources. In his own day, Summers' credibility among university-affiliated scholars was adversely impacted by the acrimonious disputes in which he engaged with others working in the same field.

The other major focus of Summers' literary scholarship was Gothic fiction. He edited three collections of Gothic horror short stories, as well as an incomplete edition of two of the seven obscure Gothic novels, known as the "Northanger Horrid Novels", that Jane Austen mentioned in her Gothic parody novel Northanger Abbey. He was instrumental in rediscovering those lost works, which some had supposed were inventions of Jane Austen herself. He also published biographies of Austen and Ann Radcliffe, a writer of Gothic fiction. Summers' Gothic Bibliography, published in 1940, has been characterized as "flawed but useful."

Summers compiled three anthologies of supernatural stories, The Supernatural Omnibus, The Grimoire and other Supernatural Stories, and Victorian Ghost Stories. He has been described as "the major anthologist of supernatural and Gothic fiction" in the 1930s.<ref>Mike Ashley, "Anthologies" in The Encyclopedia of Fantasy, edited by John Clute and John Grant. London : Orbit, 1997.  (p.42).</ref>

He also edited the poetry of Richard Barnfield, a contemporary of Shakespeare. Summers' introduction to his 1936 edition of Barnfield's poems stressed the homosexual theme of some of those works, particularly The Affectionate Shepherd.

The occult

From 1916 onwards, Summers regularly published articles in popular occult periodicals, including The Occult Review and the Spiritualist periodical Light. In 1926 his work on The History of Witchcraft and Demonology appeared as part of the series on "History of Civilization" published by Kegan Paul and edited by C. K. Ogden. In the introduction to that book, Summers wrote:

The book sold well and attracted considerable attention in the press. That success made Summers "something of a social celebrity" and allowed him to give up teaching and write full time. In 1927 a companion volume, The Geography of Witchcraft, also appeared in Ogden's "History of Civilization" series.

In 1928, Summers published the first English translation of Heinrich Kramer's Malleus Maleficarum ("The Hammer of Witches"), a 15th-century Latin manual on the hunting of witches. In his introduction, Summers insists that the reality of witchcraft is an essential part of Catholic doctrine and declares the Malleus an admirable and correct account of witchcraft and of the methods necessary to combat it. In fact, however, the Catholic authorities of the 15th century had condemned the Malleus on both ethical and legal grounds. Other Catholic scholars contemporary with Summers were also highly critical of the Malleus. For instance, the Rev. Herbert Thurston's article on "Witchcraft" for the Catholic Encyclopedia of 1912, refers to the publication of the Malleus as a "disastrous episode."

Summers then turned to vampires, producing The Vampire: His Kith and Kin (1928) and The Vampire in Europe (1929), and later to werewolves with The Werewolf (1933). Summers' work on the occult is notorious for his unusual and old-fashioned writing style, his display of erudition, and his purported belief in the reality of the subjects he treats.

In 1933, copies of Summers' translations of The Confessions of Madeleine Bavent and of Ludovico Maria Sinistrari's Demoniality were seized by the police due to their explicit accounts of sexual intercourse between humans and demons. At the ensuing trial of the publisher for obscene libel, anthropologist E. E. Evans-Pritchard testified in defence of the scholarly value of the works in question. The publisher, Reginald Caton, was convicted and the unsold copies destroyed.

According to Brian Doherty, Summers' later work on witchcraft, published in the 1930s and 1940s, "adopted a far more paranoid and conspiracy-driven worldview" than his earlier writings on the subject. These later writings draw extensively from earlier conspiracy theorists such as the French counter-revolutionary Abbé Augustin Barruel and the English Fascist Nesta Helen Webster. As such, Summers' work may have influenced the "Satanic Panic" of the 1980s and 1990s.

Other pursuits

Summers cultivated his reputation for eccentricity. The Times wrote he was "in every way a 'character' and in some sort a throwback to the Middle Ages." His biographer, Father Brocard Sewell (writing under the pseudonym "Joseph Jerome"), paints the following portrait:

Summers wrote works of hagiography on Catherine of Siena and Anthony Maria Zaccaria, but his primary religious interest was always in the occult. While Aleister Crowley, with whom he was acquainted, adopted the persona of a modern-day witch, Summers played the part of the learned Catholic witch-hunter. Despite his conservative religiosity, Summers was an active member of the British Society for the Study of Sex Psychology, to which he contributed an essay on the Marquis de Sade.

In 1926, Summers advertised in the London Times for a secretary to assist him with his literary work.  A young Cyril Connolly responded, but found Summers uncongenial and turned down the position.  Connolly privately mocked Summers in blank verse as "a sorcerer / a fruity unfrocked cleric of the Nineties / Like an old toad that carries in his head / The jewel of literature, a puffy satyr / That blends his Romish ritual with the filth / Scrawled on Pompeian pavement."

The posthumously published personal diaries of socialite and later Conservative politician Sir Henry Channon relate how Channon first met Summers at a dinner party in Summers' honour given by Lady Cunard in January 1928. Channon's diaries then describe a series of visits to Summers' home in Richmond. Channon recounts that, in more than one occasion and at Channon's suggestion, Summers took Channon upstairs to his private chapel after dinner and beat him over the altar. Channon characterized Summers as a "lecherous priest", "a madman", and "as dangerous as he is brilliant", cutting off contact with him after a couple of months.

The popular novelist Dennis Wheatley relates that he was introduced to Summers by the journalist and politician Tom Driberg while Wheatley was researching occultism for his novel The Devil Rides Out (1934). A weekend visit by Wheatley and his wife to Summers' home in Alresford was cut short by the Wheatleys, who determined "never to see the, perhaps not so Reverend, gentleman again". Summers and Wheatley continued to correspond on friendly terms, but Wheatley reportedly based the character of the evil Canon Copely-Syle, in his novel To the Devil – a Daughter (1953), on Montague Summers.

Montague Summers wrote several original works of fiction, but none of these were published during his lifetime. The unpublished manuscripts include two plays: William Henry: A Play in Four Acts and Piers Gaveston (whose text is now lost and whose title is sometimes listed as Edward II). A number of ghost stories and a short novel, The Bride of Christ, were found among Summers' papers and published long after his death.

 Relations with the Catholic Church 

Summers presented himself as an uncompromising defender of Catholic orthodoxy, but none of his books on religious subjects was ever published with the approval of Catholic authorities (see nihil obstat and imprimatur). His work on witchcraft attracted very negative comment from an important Catholic scholar, the Jesuit Herbert Thurston, who wrote in 1927 that

Father Thurston also called attention to the fact that Summers did not figure in any register as either an Anglican or a Catholic priest, but was instead a literary figure with distinctly Decadent tastes. According to Bernard Doherty, Thurston may have been concerned that Summers' writings on witchcraft could have been a "mystification" akin to the Taxil hoax of the 1890s, intended to bring ridicule upon the Catholic Church.  In 1938 another prominent English Catholic, Mons. Ronald Knox, angrily objected to having his own essay on G. K. Chesterton published in a collection on Great Catholics edited by Fr. Claude Williamson, after Knox learned that the book would also include an essay on John Dryden by Montague Summers.Gerard P. O'Sullivan, "Prologue: The Continuing Quest for Montague Summers," in Montague Summers, The Vampire: His Kith and King – A Critical Edition, ed. Jonathan Edgar Browning (Berkeley, CA: Apocryphile Press, 2011), pp. xxviii- lxxii

The prominent Catholic historian Jeffrey Burton Russell, a specialist in the religion of the European Middle Ages, wrote in 1972 that

Death

Montague Summers died at his home in Richmond, Surrey in August 1948. The Catholic rector of St Elizabeth of Portugal Church refused a public requiem mass, but allowed instead a private graveside ceremony. Summers' grave in Richmond Cemetery was unmarked until the late 1980s, when Sandy Robertson and Edwin Pouncey organised the Summers Project to garner donations for a gravestone. It now bears his favoured phrase "tell me strange things".

Summers bequeathed his estate and papers to his long-time personal secretary and companion Hector Stuart-Forbes, who was later buried in the same plot as Summers. An autobiography of Summers was published posthumously in 1980 as The Galanty Show, though it left much unrevealed about the author's life. In the 2000s, many of Summers' personal papers were re-discovered in Canada, where they had been kept by members of Stuart-Forbes's family. A collection of Summers' papers is now at the Georgetown University library.

Works

Books on the occultThe History of Witchcraft and Demonology, 1926The Geography of Witchcraft, 1927 (reprinted )The Vampire, His Kith and Kin: A Critical Edition, 1928 [2011] (reprinted by Senate in 1993 as simply The Vampire; reprinted with alternate title: Vampires and Vampirism ), edited by John Edgar BrowningThe Vampire in Europe: A Critical Edition, 1929 [2011] (reprinted ) (reprinted with alternate title: The Vampire in Lore and Legend ), edited by John Edgar BrowningThe Werewolf, 1933 (reprinted with alternate title: The Werewolf in Lore and Legend )A Popular History of Witchcraft, 1937Witchcraft and Black Magic, 1946 (reprinted)The Physical Phenomena of Mysticism, 1947

Poetry and dramaAntinous and Other Poems, 1907William Henry (play), 1939, unpublishedPiers Gaveston (play), 1940, unpublished

Fiction anthologies edited by SummersThe Grimoire and Other Supernatural Stories, 1936The Supernatural Omnibus, 1947

Other booksSt. Catherine of Siena, 1903Lourdes, 1904A Great Mistress of Romance: Ann Radcliffe, 1917Jane Austen, 1919St. Antonio-Maria Zaccaria, 1919Essays in Petto, 1928Architecture and the Gothic Novel, 1931The Restoration Theatre, 1934The Playhouse of Pepys, 1935The Gothic Quest: a History of the Gothic Novel 1938A Gothic Bibliography 1941 (copyright 1940)Six Ghost Stories (1938, not published until October 2019)The Bride of Christ and other fictions (posthumous, 2019)

As editor or translatorWorks of Mrs. Aphra Behn, 1915Complete Works of Congreve, 1923Complete Works of Wycherley, 1924The Castle of Otranto by Horace Walpole, 1924The Complete Works of Thomas Shadwell, 1927Covent Garden Drollery, 1927Horrid Mysteries by the Marquis de Grosse 1927 (part of an incomplete edition of the Northanger Horrid Novels).The Necromancer; or, The Tale of the Black Forest by 'Ludwig Flammenberg' 1927 (part of an incomplete edition of the 'Northanger Horrid Novels').Demoniality by Ludovico Maria Sinistrari, 1927The Malleus Maleficarum of Heinrich Kramer and Jacob Sprenger, 1928The Discovery of Witches, 1928 by Matthew Hopkins (reprinted )Compendium Maleficarum by Francesco Maria Guazzo, translated by E.A. Ashwin, 1929Demonolatry by Nicolas Remy, translated by E.A. Ashwin, 1930The Supernatural Omnibus, 1931 (reprinted )Dryden: The Dramatic Works, 1931-32Victorian Ghost Stories, 1936The Poems of Richard Barnfield, 1936The Complete Works of Thomas Otway, 1936Gothic Bibliography, 1940

Bibliography

d'Arch Smith, Timothy. "Montague Summers, A Bibliography". London: Nicholas Vane, 1964. (Revised edition 1983, Aquarian Press).
Jerome, Joseph. Montague Summers: A Memoir. London: Cecil and Amelia Woolf, 1965 (edition limited to 750 copies). "Joseph Jerome" is a pseudonym of the Carmelite Father Brocard Sewell
Frank, Frederick S. Montague Summers: A Bibliographical Portrait''. London: The Scarecrow Press. 1988

References

External links

 The Montague Summers papers at Georgetown University
 A biography with photos
 The Demonologist: Montague Summers
 
 
 
 
 
 
 

1880 births
1948 deaths
People educated at Clifton College
English short story writers
English non-fiction writers
English Roman Catholics
20th-century Anglican deacons
Fellows of the Royal Society of Literature
Vampirism
Werewolves
Witchcraft in England
English male dramatists and playwrights
English male short story writers
20th-century English dramatists and playwrights
20th-century occultists
20th-century British short story writers
20th-century English clergy
Burials at Richmond Cemetery
20th-century English male writers
English male non-fiction writers